Ciszyca Górna  is a village in the administrative district of Gmina Tarłów, within Opatów County, Świętokrzyskie Voivodeship, in south-central Poland.

The village has a population of 240.

References

Villages in Opatów County
Radom Governorate
Kielce Voivodeship (1919–1939)